Romanization of Korean is the official Korean-language romanization system in North Korea. Announced by the Sahoe Kwahagwŏn, it is an adaptation of the older McCune–Reischauer system, which it replaced in 1992, and it was updated in 2002 and 2012.

Transcription rules

Vowels

Consonants 

In double consonants in the end of a word or before a consonant, only one of them is written:
닭섬 → Taksŏm
물곬 → Mulkol

However, in the case before a vowel, both consonants are written:
붉은바위 → Pulgŭnbawi
앉은바위 → Anjŭnbawi

The soft voiceless consonants between vowels ㄱ, ㄷ, and ㅂ and those between resonant sounds and vowels are transcribed as g, d, and b.

Final consonants may undergo assimilation before resonants.
백마산 → Paengmasan
꽃마을 → KKonmaŭl
압록강 → Amrokgang

When lax consonants become tense in compound words, they are transcribed as tense consonants if they are preceded by a vowel. Also, if the next element begins with a resonant, then n is added before it.
기대산 → Kittaesan
새별읍 → Saeppyŏl-ŭp
뒤문 → Twinmun

The consonant clusters ㄴㄹ and ㄴㄴ are only transcribed as ll if they correspond with longstanding usage; ㄹㄹ does not have a special transcription.
천리마 → Chŏllima
한나산 → Hallasan
찔레골 → JJilregol

Double consonants may be capitalized as a single unit: kk → KK.

Guide
A personal name is written by family name first, followed by a space and the given name with the first letter capitalized. Also, each letter of a name of Chinese character origin is written separately. The given name's first initial is transcribed in a voiceless letter, even when it becomes resonant in pronunciation.
김꽃분이 → Kim KKotpuni
박동구 → Pak Tong Gu
안복철 → An Pok Chŏl

A name for administrative units is hyphenated from the placename proper:

도 → -do
시 → -si
군 → -gun
면 → -myŏn

리 → -ri
동 → -dong
구 → -gu
구역 → -guyŏk

However, a name for geographic features and artificial structures is not hyphenated:

산 → san
거리 → gŏri
고개 → gogae
대 → dae

봉 → bong
교 → gyo
골 → gol
각 → gak

벌 → bŏl
관 → gwan
곶 → got
강 → gang

Sound changes are not transcribed in the suffixes above:
삿갓봉 → Satkatbong
압록강 → Amrokgang

Transcription of geographical names may be simplified by removing breves and by reducing initial double consonants to single consonants:
서포 → Sŏpho → Sopho
찔레골 → JJilregol → Jilregol

Notes

References

Romanization of Korean